GTK is a cross-platform widget toolkit for creating graphical user interfaces.

GTK may also refer to:

Computing
 Group Temporal Key, in the IEEE 802.11i-2004 wireless network security

Other uses
 GTK (TV series), an Australian TV series
 Ghost Trackers, a Canadian reality TV show
 GTK Rossiya, a Russian airline
 Geologian tutkimuskeskus (Geological Survey of Finland), a Finnish government agency

See also
 gtk--, former name of gtkmm, a C++ interface for GTK